Two ships of the Royal Navy have borne the name HMS Llewellyn, a Welsh name, and one used by a number of historic figures including Llywelyn the Great:

 was a wooden paddle packet launched in 1848 and sold into mercantile service in 1850.
 was a  destroyer, built as HMS Picton but renamed before being launched in 1913. She was sold in 1922.

Royal Navy ship names